Diana Plotkin is a neighborhood activist in the Fairfax District of Los Angeles.  As president of the Beverly Wilshire Homes Association (BWHA), she led challenges to local projects including the Ma Maison Sofitel (hotel and restaurant), the Los Angeles Red Line Subway, the Grove shopping mall and the Beverly Connection shopping mall. She and the BWHA later reached settlement agreements with Ma Maison Sofitel, the Grove and the Beverly Connection in exchange for dropping their opposition.  She has recently reversed her position on the subway, supporting its expansion.

She has been a member of the Los Angeles County Democratic Party's Central Committee (LADCP) since 1994, and is co-chair of the LADCP's Candidate Interview Committee, the body that recommends candidates for endorsement by the party.

References 

Date of birth missing (living people)
Living people
California Democrats
People from Los Angeles
Year of birth missing (living people)